Jackie Walker may refer to:

 Jackie Walker (American football, born 1962), American football linebacker
 Jackie Walker (American football, born 1950) (1950–2002), American football linebacker
 Jackie Walker (activist) (born 1954), British left-wing activist
 Jackie Walker (gymnastics), gymnastics coach at Louisiana State University, Stanford University and San Jose State University
 Jackie Walker (singer) (born 1939), American popular music tenor singer